Emma Elizabeth Brigham (June 10, 1872 – July 17, 1973) was an American politician.

Personal life
Brigham was born on June 10, 1872 in Hartford, Vermont. She was a descendant of colonial Massachusetts Governors John Winthrop and Thomas Dudley.

She married Dr. Fred C. Brigham in 1900 and they had a daughter, Mrs. J. Kendall Joy. She died on July 17, 1973 in Hackettstown, New Jersey, and was survived by two sisters, Alleda T. Neal and Mrs. A.C. Pasini. Her funeral was held at Springfield's Hope Congregational Church and was buried in the city's Oak Grove Cemetery.

Career

After passing the state exam to receive a teacher's certificate at the age of 13, Brigham taught in a rural Vermont school for two years. She then attended the Randolph Normal School before earning a nursing diploma from the Massachusetts General Hospital.

Brigham was the first woman on Springfield, Massachusetts' Common Council and the first woman to serve on its Board of Aldermen. From 1928 to 1936, Brigham represented Springfield's Ward 4 in the Massachusetts House of Representatives as a Republican.

References

1872 births
1973 deaths
Politicians from Springfield, Massachusetts
Members of the Massachusetts House of Representatives
People from Hartford, Vermont
Massachusetts Republicans